Cyrtandra platyphylla, the ilihia, is a species of flowering plant in the family Gesneriaceae, native to Hawaii. A common shrub of the rainforest understory, it is found on Maui and the big island of Hawaii.

References

platyphylla
Endemic flora of Hawaii
Plants described in 1861
Taxa named by Asa Gray
Flora without expected TNC conservation status